Bondarevo is a rural locality (a selo) and the administrative center of Bondarevskoye Rural Settlement, Kantemirovsky District, Voronezh Oblast, Russia. The population was 808 as of 2010. There are 7 streets.

Geography 
Bondarevo is located 53 km northwest of Kantemirovka (the district's administrative centre) by road. Volokonovka is the nearest rural locality.

References 

Rural localities in Kantemirovsky District